The Liverpool Muslim Institute was founded by Abdullah Quilliam in 1887.

Overview

William Henry Quilliam was born in Liverpool in 1856. He developed an interest in Islam when travelling in Morocco. In 1887 he converted to the religion, taking the name Abdullah Quilliam and founding the Liverpool Muslim Institute with Mrs Elizabeth Cates. Within two years they had set up a small mosque within their building at 8, Brougham Terrace, on West Derby Road, Liverpool. The Liverpool Mosque and Muslim Institute was officially established in 1891. This was probably the first recorded mosque in the United Kingdom, as the earlier date attributed to the mosque at 2 Glynrhondda Street, Cardiff has been discounted.

By 1893 they started publishing The Crescent on a weekly basis, to be supplemented by The Islamic World, which appeared on a monthly basis. They developed their own printshop in the basement of the building and soon attracted an international readership from across 20 countries.

Maulavi Barkatullah worked at the institute from 1895 to 1899. Robert Stanley served as the vice president of mosque.

By the turn of the century they numbered 150, mostly English people. They were able to expand into adjacent buildings and soon organised a school. They also developed a library, a reading room, museum and science laboratory, providing evening classes for Muslim and non-Muslim alike.

Quilliam left Liverpool in 1908 in advance of being struck off as a solicitor and his son disposed of the property that had been used as a mosque and Islamic centre and the Muslim community in Liverpool dispersed. Brougham Terrace became home to the Liverpool Register Office until 2000.

The Abdullah Quilliam Society was formed in 1996. The Society is raising funds to restore 8–10, Brougham Terrace to re-open the historic mosque and establish an educational centre. It has signed a two-year lease on the premises and has started restoration work.

8, Brougham Terrace, West Derby Road  was upgraded to a Grade II* listed building in 2018. It is built in brick, partly stuccoed, with stone dressings, and a slate roof.  The terrace has three storeys, and is in six bays.  The windows are sashes.  At the top is a shallow parapet.

References

External links

Abdullah Quilliam Society - Official Website
English Heritage; Where was Britain's first recorded Mosque?

History of Liverpool
1887 establishments in England
Religion in Merseyside
Mosques completed in 1891
Religion in Liverpool
Mosques in England